Bert Holcroft was an English former professional rugby league footballer, coach and writer on rugby league coaching.

Military service
Bert Holcroft joined the Royal Navy at aged 18 and was 20 when he served aboard the  HMS Petunia. On 6 June 1944, HMS Petunia was among the naval force that took part in the invasion of Normandy, and on D-Day. HMS Petunia was an escort vessel for one of the assault convoys.  During the assault the ship received a "mayday" from an American tank landing ship that had struck a mine. Holcroft was among those who saved 60 of the soldiers from the tank landing ship. In 2016 Holcroft was decorated with the Legion d'Honneur by the French government - an award Holcroft dedicated to the men saved on D-Day.

Rugby league
After the war Bert Holcroft played rugby league for amateur team Wigan Road Working Men's RLFC as well as the reserve team of Leigh.  He also coached the B and Colts junior teams for Leigh.

In the 1960s Holcroft and his wife, Bridget, moved to Australia where he coached junior side Murwillumbah Brothers to successive premierships in the Tweed Rugby League in 1961 and 1962.  Holcroft also coached the Bundaberg representative team where he introduced new training techniques relating to diet and weight training.

Holcroft was appointed as coach of Eastern Suburbs in the New South Wales Rugby League premiership in 1965. Easts were not a strong side at the time and under Holcroft  they only won three games of the 32 played in the two seasons he was in charge; in 1966 Easts became the most recent premiership team not to win a game during a season.

Over the years Holcroft has developed his training and fitness techniques into a series of books for rugby and football. Holcroft died on August 17, 2021.

References

1925 births
2021 deaths
English rugby league coaches
English rugby league players
Rugby league players from Leigh, Greater Manchester
Sydney Roosters coaches
Recipients of the Legion of Honour